is a combat flight video game developed and published by Sega. The game is a part of the After Burner series, and was first released in arcades in 2006 and was later released digitally to Xbox 360 and PlayStation 3 in April 2010.

Like previous incarnations of After Burner, the "Deluxe" After Burner: Climax cabinet has a servo-equipped chair; a new function is a button that locks the chair into a static upright position. Two other cabinet versions include a "Commander" version, which only tilts side to side, and the "Standard" version, which doesn't move at all. The "Deluxe" version cabinet has a widescreen LCD monitor, while the "Standard" and "Commander" models have a 29" CRT.

The digital version was delisted from both Xbox Live and PlayStation Store in December 2014, and was removed from the mobile storefronts in May 2015. The mobile version was re-released via the Sega Forever service in April 2019 but is no longer available.

Gameplay
After Burner Climax introduces two new flyable aircraft to the series: the F/A-18E Super Hornet and F-15E Strike Eagle. The iconic F-14 Tomcat from previous games has been replaced with the F-14D Super Tomcat. The player selects the aircraft at the start screen.

While choosing their plane, the player can use the throttle to choose between four different paintjobs for each of the three planes. These paint jobs consist of a "Standard" scheme, "Camouflage" scheme, "Special" scheme, and "Low Visibility" scheme. After choosing their plane, the player can also choose to listen to After Burner: Climax'''s music or the original soundtrack from After Burner II by holding the throttle back and hitting the missile button.

Reception
The Australian video game talk show Good Game'' two reviewers gave the game a 6/10 and 8/10.

References

External links
Official website
After Burner Climax at SEGA Amusements U.S.A. website
After Burner Climax at Arcade History
Xbox Page

2006 video games
Android (operating system) games
Arcade video games
Flight simulation video games
IOS games
PlayStation Network games
Sega-AM2 games
Sega arcade games
Video games developed in Japan
Video games scored by Hiroshi Kawaguchi
Xbox 360 Live Arcade games
Xbox 360 games
Single-player video games
Shoot 'em ups
Delisted digital-only games